Jürgen Brietzke (born 31 May 1959) is a German sailor. He competed in the men's 470 event at the 1988 Summer Olympics.

References

External links
 

1959 births
Living people
German male sailors (sport)
Olympic sailors of East Germany
Sailors at the 1988 Summer Olympics – 470
People from Ludwigslust-Parchim